The Mergellandroute ("marl land route") is a tourist route through South Limburg, Netherlands, mapped out by the ANWB.

The Mergellandroute goes mostly through the local hills, which are in contrast with the lesser relief found in the rest of the Netherlands. The route has a length of 110 kilometers by car and motorcycle or 136.9 kilometers by bike.

Route 
The route for motorised vehicles (brown roadsigns) passes through the following towns. Note that the route is circular and any location can be used as starting place.

Maastricht
Eijsden
Mesch (Heiweg)
Moerslag (Bukel)
Sint Geertruid
Mheer (Grensheuvel)
Noorbeek (Wolfsberg)
Slenaken (Loorberg)
Eperheide
Epen (Vijlenerbos/Zevenwegen)
Vaalsbroek
Vijlen
Mechelen
Partij
Wittem (Wittemerberg)
Eys
Simpelveld (Oude Huls)
Trintelen
Fromberg
Ransdaal (Mareheiweg)
Klimmen (Hellebeuk)
Hulsberg
Arensgenhout
Oensel
Ulestraten
Geulle
Bunde
Itteren
Borgharen
Maastricht

The route for bicycles (green roadsigns) goes via:
Maastricht
Bemelen (Bemelerberg)
Cadier en Keer (Bundersberg)
Honthem
Eckelrade
Gronsveld
Eijsden
Mesch (Heiweg)
Moerslag (Bukel)
Sint Geertruid
Mheer (Grensheuvel)
Noorbeek (Wolfsberg)
Slenaken (Loorberg)
Eperheide
Epen (Vijlenerbos/Zevenwegen)
Vaalsbroek
Vijlen
Mechelen
Partij
Wittem (Wittemerberg)
Eys (Eyserbos)
Elkenrade
Fromberg
Schin op Geul (Keutenberg)
Ingber
IJzeren
Sibbe
Oud-Valkenburg
Schin op Geul (Walemmerberg)
Walem
Klimmen (Hellebeuk)
Hulsberg
Valkenburg (Ravensbos)
Schimmert
Ulestraten
Geulle
Bunde
Rothem
Maastricht (Kuitenbergweg)
Berg
Maastricht

References

Cycleways in the Netherlands
Tourism in the Netherlands
Geography of Limburg (Netherlands)
South Limburg (Netherlands)